The Maerdang Dam is a concrete-face rock-fill dam currently under construction on the upper Yellow River in Maqên County, Qinghai Province, China. Construction on the dam began in 2011 and its 2,200 MW power station was initially expected to be operational in 2018. On 13 November 2013, the river was successfully diverted around the construction site. Works suffered delays and were still ongoing as of early 2023.

Its power station will generate an annual 7,24 TWh of electricity.

See also

List of tallest dams in the world
List of dams and reservoirs in China
List of tallest dams in China

References

Dams in China
Dams on the Yellow River
Dams under construction in China
Golog Tibetan Autonomous Prefecture
Concrete-face rock-fill dams
Hydroelectric power stations in Qinghai